USS Starboard Unit was a United States Navy patrol vessel acquired in 1918 but never commissioned.

Starboard Unit was built as a civilian motorboat of the same name. On 5 November 1918, the U.S. Navy acquired her under a free lease from her owner, Joseph W. Marsh, for use as a section patrol boat during World War I.

World War I ended on 11 November 1918, six days after Starboard Units acquisition. No longer needed for naval service, Starboard Unit never received a section patrol (SP) number and was never commissioned. The Navy returned her to Marsh on 5 March 1919.

References
 
 Starboard Unit at Department of the Navy Naval History and Heritage Command Online Library of Selected Images: U.S. Navy Ships -- Listed by Hull Number "SP" #s and "ID" #s -- World War I Era Vessels without Numbers (listed alphabetically by name)
 NavSource Online: Section Patrol Craft Photo Archive Starboard Unit

Patrol vessels of the United States Navy
World War I patrol vessels of the United States